The participation of South Korea in the ABU TV Song Festival has occurred eleven times since the inaugural ABU TV Song Festival began in 2012. Since their début in 2012, the South Korean entry has been organised by the national broadcaster Korean Broadcasting System (KBS).

History
KBS is one of the founder members in the ABU TV Song Festivals, having participated in the very first ABU TV Song Festival 2012.

Participation overview

Hostings

References 

Countries at the ABU Song Festival